Minchau is a residential neighbourhood in the Mill Woods area of Edmonton, Alberta, Canada.  It is named for August Minchau, a Prussian immigrant who settled in the Mill Woods area in the late 19th century.

The community is represented by the Ridgewood Community League, established in 1982, which maintains a community hall and outdoor rink located at Mill Woods Road East and 37 Avenue.

Geography 
Minchau is bounded on the west by 50 Street, on the south by 34 Avenue, and on the northeast by the Mill Creek Ravine. Surrounding neighbourhoods are Hillview and Greenview to the west, Tawa to the southwest, Weinlos and Bisset to the south, Silver Berry to the southeast, Kiniski Gardens and Wild Rose to the northeast, and Jackson Heights to the north.

Demographics 

Residential development 
Approximately four out of five (78%) of residences in the neighbourhood are owner occupied, with the majority of residences (72%) being single-family dwellings.  Apartments in buildings with fewer than five stories and row houses each make up approximately 10% of the residences.  Substantially all the remainder are duplexes.

Education 
There is a single school in the neighbourhood, Minchau School.

Surrounding neighbourhoods

See also 
 Edmonton Federation of Community Leagues

References

External links 
Minchau Neighbourhood Profile

Neighbourhoods in Edmonton